Hubert Deltour (23 March 1911 – 20 December 1993) was a Belgian racing cyclist. He rode in the 1937 Tour de France.

References

1911 births
1993 deaths
Belgian male cyclists
Place of birth missing